A significant early spring tornado outbreak occurred during the afternoon and evening hours of March 5, 2022 in the Midwest, primarily in the state of Iowa, before transitioning to a damaging wind event across northern parts of Illinois and Indiana. Multiple tornadoes were reported, several of which were produced by a dominant supercell thunderstorm in central Iowa. One long-track, low-end EF4 tornado caused major damage near the towns of Winterset and Norwalk, resulting in six fatalities. Multiple other supercells spawned along an area of moderate destabilization in northern Missouri, prompting further tornado warnings in southern Iowa, as they entered a highly favorable environment for maturing. Large hail and damaging wind gusts accompanied the storms, which continue their passage across the Midwestern states into overnight. More tornadic weather was confirmed in Arkansas and Missouri the next day and into the early morning of March 7. In addition to that, straight line winds killed one person near Hazel, Kentucky when a semi trailer was blown over on US 641. Another non-tornadic fatality occurred in western New York as the storm approached.

Meteorological synopsis

March 5
On March 4, the Storm Prediction Center (SPC) issued a slight risk outlook for severe weather for a negatively tilted shortwave trough positioned over the High Plains. The outlook included the possibility of strong winds, large hail, and a 5 percent chance for tornadoes, mostly throughout southern Iowa. The next day, the SPC upped their alert level to an enhanced risk, centered in Iowa, as a stronger certainty arose for severe weather. The probabilities for damaging winds were increased to 30 percent, and the probabilities for tornadoes were elevated to a 10 percent, unhatched area (indicating a <10% chance of EF2 or stronger tornadoes) centered along southwestern Iowa. At noon, the SPC issued its first tornado watch, for southern Iowa and northwestern Missouri, discussing the moderate probabilities for tornadoes to occur, although a major tornado outbreak was not expected.

As the afternoon advanced, multiple supercell thunderstorms developed in the area of concern, rapidly developing into powerful, tornadic storms. One of these cells became dominant over southwestern Iowa, producing two weak tornadoes. It recycled its mesocyclone and produced a violent, long-track EF4 tornado, prompting the issuance of multiple PDS tornado warnings. It caused tremendous damage in the towns of Winterset and Norwalk, resulting in six fatalities. It also caused minor/moderate damage in Pleasant Hill After the tornado dissipated, the supercell would produce three more tornadoes, one rated EF1, and two rated EF2. Multiple other tornadic storms would soon develop in northern Missouri and advance into southern Iowa, leading to more PDS tornado warnings. One of these tornadoes reached EF3 intensity, causing a fatality near Chariton. Large hail and a few damaging wind gusts accompanied the supercells.

As the supercells gradually weakened over eastern Iowa, they congealed into a long squall line, as the storm system moved into western Illinois and southern Wisconsin with weak tornadoes touching down in both states. As the overnight hours progressed, the squall line produced damaging wind gusts all throughout the north and central regions of Illinois and Indiana, including in the Chicago metropolitan area. One weak tornado touched down in Indiana, while another two more touched down in Ohio. It eventually progressed and dissipated over the Great Lakes, over northern Michigan and southern Ontario.

March 6–7
After the initial round of storms dissipated overnight on March 5, a new shortwave trough began stationing itself over in the southern southwestern Plains on the late-morning of March 6. The SPC issued an enhanced risk for the regions encompassing northwestern Arkansas and southwestern Missouri. This created an environment conductive to severe weather, and a 10% hatched risk for tornadoes was introduced for the northern region of Arkansas, as supercells capable of producing a few strong tornadoes were expected. A 30% contour of damaging winds was also noticed, along the same general areas in Arkansas. As such, the SPC issued its first tornado watch for the day, encompassing extreme southeastern Oklahoma, northern portions of Arkansas, and the southern portions of Missouri, including the Missouri Bootheel.

Multiple supercells developed as the afternoon progressed, quickly maturing as they entered the unstable atmosphere stationed over northern Arkansas. Several tornadoes were reported, three of which were produced by a long-track, intense supercell. One low-end EF2 tornado struck Sage, Arkansas, injuring six people. Tornadic activity continued past midnight into the early morning of March 7. One non-tornadic fatality occurred early that morning when a semi truck carrying logs was blown over on U.S. 641 near Hazel, Kentucky, ejecting and killing the passenger. A large slight risk area was issued for that afternoon from northern Alabama northeastward through the Northeastern United States for the threat of damaging winds, although isolated tornadoes were possible from northern Alabama to eastern Kentucky. Scattered severe weather occurred in the southern part of the risk area while a narrow, but strong squall line produced widespread wind damage in the northeast that afternoon with a total of 194 reports of severe wind gusts and wind damage. However, no tornadoes touched down and no further injuries occurred. The severe threat ended once all the storms pushed offshore.

Confirmed tornadoes

March 5 event

March 6 event

March 7 event

Macksburg–Winterset–Norwalk–Newton, Iowa

This violent multiple-vortex wedge tornado produced major damage along its path and caused six fatalities. The tornado was the deadliest and most intense of the outbreak, and was the third tornado produced by the long-tracked Winterset supercell. It first touched down near the intersection of Deer Run Avenue and 280th Street to the north of Macksburg. Moving northeast, the tornado began to rapidly intensify while traversing mainly open farmland and forest. The tornado then began to approach the southern outskirts of Winterset as it crossed Carver Road just south of town. Here, the tornado exhibited multiple vortices and reached EF4 strength, its point of maximum intensity. Several homes were severely damaged or destroyed, a few of which were leveled or swept away. Cars were flipped and thrown, outbuildings were obliterated, debris was strewn long distances, and many large trees were snapped and denuded in this area as well. All six fatalities from the tornado occurred in the Winterset area, including four members of a family who were killed in the total destruction of their home.

After the large and destructive tornado exited the Winterset area, it continued to the northeast and passed through rural areas near Patterson, continuing to exhibit a multi-vortex structure but causing little damage as moved through sparsely-populated areas. The tornado then weakened some but remained strong as it tracked through the southeastern fringes of the Des Moines metropolitan area, moving through the outskirts of Norwalk, Avon, and Pleasant Hill. Homes in this area sustained major structural damage, outbuildings and garages were destroyed, many trees and power poles were snapped, roofing was torn off of a manufacturing plant, and the Norwalk Public Works building had its garage doors blown in. Continuing to the northeast, the tornado became increasingly rain-wrapped, downing more power poles causing additional damage to homes as it passed south of Colfax, and then weakened further as it moved through Lambs Grove and the north side of Newton before dissipating. Damage in Newton consisted of downed trees, damage to a baseball field, and minor to moderate structural damage. The TPI Composites manufacturing plant had a large portion of its roof torn off near the end of the damage path. At least five people were injured. This tornado became the first EF4 tornado to affect Iowa since October 4, 2013, was the deadliest tornado in Iowa since May 25, 2008, the longest tracked tornado in Iowa since April 27, 2014, and the northernmost confirmed violent tornado so early in the season.

Aftermath
Iowa Governor Kim Reynolds issued a disaster proclamation for Madison County due to the tornadoes that passed through, while also saying “our hearts go out to all those affected by the deadly storms that tore through our state today.” Iowa representatives Cindy Axne and Ashley Hinson wrote a letter to the NWS looking for answers on why the tornado warnings were delayed by up to nine minutes. The letter read, “Delays of even a few minutes can mean life or death. We cannot allow lowans to be in danger due to technical problems that go unaddressed,” which they called unacceptable and that the NWS has to address with highest priority.

See also

 List of North American tornadoes and tornado outbreaks
 List of F4 and EF4 tornadoes (2020–present)
 List of United States tornadoes from January to March 2022
 Weather of 2022
 Tornado outbreak of June 1881
 Iowa tornado outbreak of November 2005
 Iowa tornado outbreak of July 2018

Notes

References

2022 meteorology
Tornadoes of 2022
2022 natural disasters in the United States
Tornado outbreaks
F4 tornadoes
Tornadoes in Iowa
2022 in Iowa
Tornadoes in Wisconsin
2022 in Wisconsin
Tornadoes in Indiana
2022 in Indiana